JAXA is Japan's national space agency.

Jaxa or JAXA may also refer to:

Places
100267 JAXA, minor planet
Jaxa (state), 17th century state in North Asia

People
Jaxa of Köpenick, German prince
Jaxa Gryfita, Polish crusader
Tina Jaxa, South African actress
Ricardo de Jaxa Malachowski, Polish-Peruvian architect

Fictional characters
Sito Jaxa, minor Star Trek character